The 2016 ISU World Figure Skating Championships took place March 28 – April 3, 2016 in Boston, Massachusetts. Figure skaters competed for the title of World champion in men's singles, ladies' singles, pairs and ice dancing. This marked the first time Boston was host to the World Figure Skating Championships. The competition determined the number of athlete slots for each federation at the 2017 World Championships.

Background 
The World Figure Skating Championships is the sport's most important annual competition sanctioned by the International Skating Union (ISU). In June 2013, the city of Boston was announced as the host city of the 2016 event. The competition was organized by U.S. Figure Skating, and the Skating Club of Boston served as the local organizing committee. Founded in 1912, it is the third-oldest skating club in the United States and is a founding member of U.S. Figure Skating.

Venues 

The TD Garden was the primary arena for the 2016 ISU World Figure Skating Championships. The venue hosted all competitions and several practice sessions. The second official practice venue for the event was DCR Steriti Rink.

TD Garden 
The TD Garden is a multipurpose arena located in Boston, Massachusetts. The arena hosted a maximum capacity of approximately 15,000 seats for the event. The TD Garden also serves as the home arena for two of Boston's professional sports teams, the Boston Celtics and the Boston Bruins.

DCR Steriti Rink 
DCR Steriti Rink is a local area rink managed by the Massachusetts Department of Conservation and Recreation. It is located in the North End neighborhood of Boston and is a short distance from the main venue. This rink served as the practice venue and was open only to credentialed participants of the event.

Records

The following new ISU best scores were set during this competition:

Argentina was represented by a skater at the ISU World Championships for the first time in history.

Qualification
Skaters were eligible for the event if they represented an ISU member nations and had reached the age of 15 before 1 July 2015 in their place of birth. National associations selected their entries according to their own criteria but the ISU mandated that their selections achieved a minimum technical elements score (TES) at an international event prior to the World Championships.

Minimum TES

Number of entries per discipline
Based on the results of the 2015 World Championships, each ISU member nation can field one to three entries per discipline.

Entries 
Member nations began announcing their selections in December 2015. The ISU published a complete list of entries on March 8, 2016.

Changes to initial assignments

Results

Men
The Men's short program was held on March 30. The free skate was held on April 1.

Ladies
The Ladies short program was held on March 31. The free skate took place on April 2, 2016. Gracie Gold took a 2.45 point lead after the short program. Anna Pogorilaya edged out Evgenia Medvedeva for second place by 0.22. Ashley Wagner, the US Nationals bronze medalist, was just out of medal position, 0.60 behind Medvedeva. The 2015 World bronze medalist Elena Radionova was in fifth, while former World champion Mao Asada was in ninth. Defending world champion Elizaveta Tuktamysheva was not selected by her federation for the event after finishing 8th at the Russian Championships. In the free skate, Medvedeva had a record-setting score of 150.10 to win the gold medal. Wagner moved into second place to win the United States' first World Championship ladies medal since 2006. Pogorilaya finished third ahead of Gold.

Pairs
The pairs short program was held on April 1 and the free skate on April 2.

Ice dancing
The short dance was held on March 30. 2015 World champions Gabriella Papadakis and Guillaume Cizeron of France obtained a small gold medal for the short dance for the first time in their career. They were followed by two American teams. 2011 World bronze medalists Maia Shibutani / Alex Shibutani placed second (-1.59) while 2015 silver medalists Madison Chock / Evan Bates took the third position, 2.24 behind the Shibutanis.

The free dance was held on March 31, 2016. Papadakis/Cizeron set a new world record for the free dance (118.17 points) and they won their second consecutive world title. The Shibutanis returned to the world podium four years after their first medal. Chock/Bates took the bronze medal, marking the third time that the U.S. has finished with two ice dancing teams on the World podium (earlier: 1966, 2011). Cappellini/Lanotte rose to fourth while Weaver/Poje finished fifth.

Medals summary

Medalists
Medals for overall placement:

Small medals for placement in the short segment:

Small medals for placement in the free segment:

By country
Table of medals for overall placement:

Table of small medals for placement in the short segment:

Table of small medals for placement in the free segment:

References

External links 
 
 2016 World Championships at the International Skating Union
 Entries and results

World Figure Skating Championships
World Figure Skating Championships
World Figure Skating Championships
World Figure Skating Championships
April  sports events in the United States
International figure skating competitions hosted by the United States
March  sports events in the United States
Sports competitions in Boston
World Figure Skating Championships